Thomas Forrest may refer to:
 Thomas Forrest (navigator) (1729?–1802?), English employee of the British East India Company
 Thomas Forrest (politician) (1747–1825), American politician
 Thomas Forrest (colonist) (1572–1641), Gentleman founder of Jamestown Virginia Colony 1608
 Thomas Forret or Forrest (died 1540), Scottish martyr

See also
 Forrest Thomas (disambiguation)